This is a list of the moths of family Notodontidae that are found in Canada. It also acts as an index to the species articles and forms part of the full List of moths of Canada.

Following the species name, there is an abbreviation that indicates the Canadian provinces or territories in which the species can be found.

Western Canada
BC = British Columbia
AB = Alberta
SK = Saskatchewan
MB = Manitoba
YT = Yukon
NT = Northwest Territories
NU = Nunavut

Eastern Canada
ON = Ontario
QC = Quebec
NB = New Brunswick
NS = Nova Scotia
PE = Prince Edward Island
NF = Newfoundland
LB = Labrador

Subfamily Heterocampinae
Heterocampa biundata Walker, 1855-MB, ON, NB
Heterocampa guttivitta (Walker, 1855)-SK, MB, ON, NB, PE
Heterocampa obliqua Packard, 1864-ON
Heterocampa subrotata Harvey, 1874-ON
Heterocampa umbrata Walker, 1855-SK, MB, ON, NB
Lochmaeus bilineata (Packard, 1864)-SK, MB, ON, NB, PE
Lochmaeus manteo Doubleday, 1841-MB, ON, NB, PE
Macrurocampa marthesia (Cramer, 1780)-MB, ON, NB
Misogada unicolor (Packard, 1864)-ON
Oligocentria lignicolor (Walker, 1855)-SK, MB, ON, NB, PE
Oligocentria pallida (Strecker, 1899)-BC
Oligocentria semirufescens (Walker, 1865)-BC, AB, SK, MB, ON, NB
Schizura apicalis (Grote & Robinson, 1866)-NB
Schizura badia (Packard, 1864)-SK, MB, ON, NB
Schizura concinna (Smith, 1797)-BC, SK, MB, ON, NB
Schizura ipomoeae Doubleday, 1841-BC, SK, MB, ON, NB, PE, NF
Schizura leptinoides (Grote, 1864)-AB, SK, MB, ON, NB
Schizura unicornis (Smith, 1797)-BC, AB, SK, MB, ON, NB, PE, NF

Subfamily Notodontinae
Cerura scitiscripta Walker, 1865-AB, SK, MB, ON, QC
Furcula borealis (Guérin-Méneville, 1832)-ON, QC, NB
Furcula cinerea (Walker, 1865)-BC, AB, SK, MB, NT, ON, QC, NB, NS
Furcula modesta (Hudson, 1891)-BC, AB, SK, MB, ON, QC, NB, NS
Furcula occidentalis (Lintner, 1878)-BC, AB, SK, MB, ON, QC, NB, NS
Furcula scolopendrina (Boisduval, 1869)-BC, AB, SK, ON, QC, NB, NS
Gluphisia avimacula Hudson, 1891-AB, SK, MB, ON, QC, NB, NS, NF
Gluphisia lintneri (Grote, 1877)-AB, SK, MB, ON, QC, NB, NS
Gluphisia septentrionis Walker, 1855-BC, AB, SK, MB, YT, ON, QC, NB, NS, PE, NF
Gluphisia severa Edwards, 1886-BC, AB
Hyperaeschra georgica (Herrich-Schäffer, 1855)-MB, ON, QC, NB
Notodonta pacifica Behr, 1892-BC
Notodonta scitipennis Walker, 1862-AB, SK, MB, ON, QC, NB, NS, NF
Notodonta simplaria Graef, 1881-BC, AB, SK, MB, YT, NT, ON, QC, NB, NS, NF
Odontosia elegans (Strecker, 1885)-BC, AB, SK, MB, ON, QC, NB, NS
Peridea angulosa (Smith, 1797)-MB, ON, QC, NB, NS
Peridea basitriens (Walker, 1855)-ON, QC, NB, NS, PE
Peridea ferruginea (Packard, 1864)-MB, ON, QC, NB, NS, PE, NF
Pheosia portlandia Edwards, 1886-BC
Pheosia rimosa Packard, 1864-BC, AB, SK, MB, ON, QC, NB, NS, PE, NF

Subfamily Nystaleinae
Dasylophia anguina (Smith, 1797)-AB, SK, MB, ON, QC
Dasylophia thyatiroides (Walker, 1862)-ON, QC, NB, NS
Symmerista albifrons (Smith, 1797)-QC, NB, NS
Symmerista canicosta Franclemont, 1946-SK, MB, ON, QC, NB, NS, PE
Symmerista leucitys Franclemont, 1946-MB, ON, QC, NB, NS

Subfamily Phalerinae
Datana angusii Grote & Robinson, 1866-ON, QC
Datana contracta Walker, 1855-ON, QC
Datana drexelii Edwards, 1884-ON, QC, NS
Datana integerrima Grote & Robinson, 1866-ON, QC
Datana ministra (Drury, 1773)-BC, SK, MB, ON, QC, NB, NS, PE
Datana perspicua Grote & Robinson, 1865-ON, QC
Ellida caniplaga (Walker, 1856)-ON, QC, NB
Nadata gibbosa (Smith, 1797)-BC, AB, SK, MB, ON, QC, NB, NS, PE, NF

Subfamily Pygaerinae
Clostera albosigma Fitch, 1856-BC, AB, SK, MB, ON, QC, NB, NS, PE, NF
Clostera apicalis (Walker, 1855)-BC, AB, SK, MB, NT, ON, QC, NB, NS, PE, NF
Clostera brucei (Edwards, 1885)-BC, AB, SK, MB, YT, ON, QC
Clostera inclusa (Hübner, [1831])-MB, ON, QC, NB
Clostera strigosa (Grote, 1882)-BC, AB, SK, MB, ON, QC, NB, NS, PE
Nerice bidentata Walker, 1855-SK, MB, ON, QC, NB, NS

Unplaced
Hyparpax aurora (Smith, 1797)-ON, QC, NS

External links
Moths of Canada at the Canadian Biodiversity Information Facility

Canada